Josette Bruce (née Josépha Pyrzbil; also Josette Dourne; 1920 – 10 February 1996) was a French novelist of Polish origin. She is remembered for taking over the literary series OSS 117 about secret agent Hubert Bonisseur de La Bath after the death of her husband Jean Bruce, creator of the series.

Biography
Born in Poland, she met her future husband, Jean Bruce, on a train. In 1966, three years after she became a widow, she was solicited by the editor of OSS 117 to continue writing the series. Her first book in the series was Les anges de Los Angeles.

She secondly married Pierre Dourne, a family friend who served as the inspiration for the recurring character by the name of Peter Dru. After 143 adventures, she wrote her last OSS 117 book, Anathème à Athènes, in 1985. Bruce also wrote mystery novels. During the 1990 Cognac Thriller Film Festival, a tribute was paid to her.

Josette Bruce died in 1996 at age 75. She was buried with her husband in the cemetery of St Peter's Church in Chantilly. Jean Bruce's daughter and step-son created and together wrote the series, New Adventures of OSS 117.

Selected works

OSS 117 

 Les anges de Los Angeles
 Halte à Malte
 Réseau zéro
 Palmarès à Palomarès
 Congo à gogo
 OSS 117 contre OSS
 Boucan à Bucarest Ombres chinoises sur Tanger Des pruneaux à Lugano Pas de roses à Ispahan Détour à Hambourg Avanies en Albanie Tornade pour OSS 117
 Coup d'état pour OSS 117
 Sarabande à Hong-Kong Surprise-partie en Colombie Finasseries finlandaises Interlude aux Bermudes Vacances pour OSS 117
 Médaille d'or pour OSS 117
 Spatiale dernière Jeux de malins à Berlin OSS 117 récolte la tempête
 Magie blanche pour OSS 117
 Gare aux Bulgares Zizanie en Asie Un soir en Côte-d'Ivoire Dans le mille au Brésil La rage au Caire Alibi en Libye Mission 117 pour OSS 117
 Coup de dingue à St-Domingue
 OSS 117 chez les hippies
 OSS 117 s'expose
 Méli-mélo à Porto-Rico
 OSS 117 en Péril
 OSS 117 traque le traître
 Chassé-croisé pour OSS 117
 OSS 117 joue de la Polonaise
 OSS 117 aime les Portugaises
 OSS 117 voit tout en noir
 OSS 117 malaise en Malaysia
 OSS 117 part en fumée
 Du sang chez les Afghans
 OSS 117 liquide
 Balade en Angola Intermède en Suède Maldonne à Lisbonne Hécatombe pour OSS 117
 Ramdam à Lausanne
 Traîtrise à Venise
 Dérive sur Tananarive
 Péril sur le Nil
 OSS 117 cherche des crosses
 Frénésie à Nicosie Sérénade espagnole pour OSS 117
 Matin calme pour OSS 117
 Autopsie en Tunisie TNT à la Trinité OSS 117 dans le brouillard
 Pleins tubes sur le Danube
 OSS 117 riposte
 OSS 117 sur la brèche
 Plaies et bosses à Mykonos
 OSS 117 aux commandes en Thaîlande
 Tango sur une corde à piano Franc et fort à Francfort OSS 117 gagne son pari à Paris
 OSS 117 et la bombe de Bombay
 OSS 117 en conflit à Bali
 OSS 117 entre en lice à l'île Maurice
 Plein chaos chez Mao Durs à cuire à Curaçao Cavalcade à Rio Trois maltaises pour OSS 117
 OSS 117 fin prêt à Taipeh
 Ultimatum pour OSS 117
 Rencontres à Ibiza pour OSS 117
 Safari pour OSS 117
 Corps à corps pour OSS 117
 OSS 117 sur un volcan à Abidjan
 OSS 117 pêche en Islande
 Tête de Turc en Turquie Coup d'éclat à Prétoria OSS 117 dernier sursis en Yougoslavie
 Coup de barre à Bahrein
 OTAN pour OSS 117
 Coup de main pour OSS 117
 Perfidies en Birmanie pour OSS 117
 Dernier round au Cameroun Dérapage en Alaska Vol de Noël pour OSS 117
 Coup de projecteur pour OSS 117
 Croisière atomique pour OSS 117
 Imbroglio pour OSS 117
 À feu et à sang pour OSS 117
 OSS 117 gagne la belle
 Combat dans l'ombre pour OSS 117
 OSS 117 joue les mercenaires
 Plan d'urgence pour OSS 117
 Choc à Bangkok pour OSS 117
 Panique en Afrique pour OSS 117
 Bagarre au Gabon pour OSS 117
 OSS 117 remporte la palme au Népal
 OSS 117 sème la désunion à la Réunion
 OSS 117 compte les coups
 Déluge à Delhi pour OSS 117
 OSS 117 chez les sorciers
 Coup de masse aux Bahamas
 OSS 117 mise en scène au Sénégal
 Accrochage sur l'Acropole pour OSS 117
 Rallye pour OSS 117
 OSS 117 au finish
 Coup d'arnaque au Danemark
 Sans fleurs ni Floride pour OSS 117
 OSS 117 arrête le massacre
 OSS 117 ne perd pas la tête
 Folies en Italie pour OSS 117
 Alarme en Afrique Australe pour OSS 117
 Salades maltaises pour OSS 117
 Panique à la Martinique pour OSS 117
 Coup de sang à Ceylan pour OSS 117
 Cauchemar irlandais pour OSS 117
 OSS 117 sur un volcan
 Sarabande pour OSS 117
 OSS 117 au Levant
 S.O.S. Brésil pour OSS 117
 California zéro pour OSS 117
 Coup de poker pour OSS 117
 K.O. à Tokyo pour OSS 117
 Casse-tête chinois pour OSS 117
 Pas de pigeon à Venise pour OSS 117
 Hallali en Australie pour OSS 117
 Que viva Mexico OSS 117
 Québec point zéro pour OSS 117
 Commando fantôme pour OSS 117
 Tuerie en Turquie
 L'enfer du désert pour OSS 117
 OSS 117 traqué à l'île de Pâques
 Piège à Berlin pour OSS 117
 Mission pyramides pour OSS 117
 Priorité absolue pour OSS 117
 Anathème à Athènes pour OSS 117''

References

Bibliography

External links

1920 births
1996 deaths
French fiction writers
French women writers
Spy fiction writers
20th-century French women
Polish emigrants to France